Sand Lake is a small lake southwest of Bisby Lodge in Herkimer County, New York. Woodhull Creek enters the lake from the north and drains south via Woodhull Creek.

See also
 List of lakes in New York

References 

Lakes of New York (state)
Lakes of Herkimer County, New York